Gena Marvin is a performance artist known for their surreal and creature drag. Their art focuses on themes of identity, self-acceptance, different forms of beauty, and the surreal.

Early life and education 
Gena Marvin was born in Magadan, Russia. She grew up practicing drag makeup in secret in her parents' house. She was greatly bullied and tormented growing up in her small village. This alongside the tale of Slender Man would become a major inspiration for Marvin’s artwork.

In 2022 Gena Marvin becomes a refugee from the Ukraine-Russian conflict moving to Paris where she lives now.

Art 
Gena Marvin’s art can effectively be found on social media websites like Instagram and Tiktok. She uses this site for their international abilities. Marvin’s art primarily consists of creature drag. She has done several public drag performances in Russia, however, the artist chooses to mostly showcase their work on social media rather than in public. Marvin has spoken about how she has felt unsafe doing her art in public.

A recent collaborative piece she did was called ‘your favorite Ephialtes’ with Polina Oleynikova. 

Another example of her work that can be tied with queer activism is the series of photos she took outside a church in Georgia dressed in creature drag. This was a means to give solidarity with queer people in Georgia. 

A recent piece, after the artist’s move to Paris, is the wrapping of her body entirely in tape to show the restrictions she felt in her home country and her fear of being drafted to go to war. 

She also recently participated in an exhibition at the art center POUSH situated close to Paris. This exhibition ‘Doh Ayay ! ဒို့အရေ’ presents the works of artists in exile and is created by the association named ‘atelier artiste exile’.

References 

Wikipedia Student Program
Living people
Performance artists
Russian performance artists
Drag performers
People from Magadan